xB Browser (formerly known as TorPark and Xerobank browser) was a web browser designed to run on both the Tor and XeroBank anonymity networks, and is available as component of the xB Machine and the xB Installer.

It is designed for use on portable media such as a USB flash drive, but it can also be used on any hard disk drive. As such, a secure and encrypted connection to any of the Tor or XeroBank routers can be created from any computer with a suitable Internet connection, and the browser clears all data that was created on the portable drive upon exit or on demand.

In March 2007 it was reported that the xB Browser was downloaded 4 million times and in February 2008 over 6.5 million downloads making xB Browser the most popular anonymous browser on the Internet.

History
Steve Topletz co-released Torpark v.1.5.0.7 with CULT OF THE DEAD COW/Hacktivismo on 19 September 2006 after more than one year of development based on Portable Firefox web browser with built in support for Tor and using the Nullsoft Scriptable Install System. In 2007 it was redesigned from scratch.

A cross-compatible version for Mac OS X and Linux was being developed based on xB Machine, due to be available in August 2008, but the development seems now abandoned.

Network usage

Tor network

xB Browser routes Internet traffic through several onion servers, obscuring the originating IP address and encrypting the data. Other applications such as Pidgin can be routed through the Tor network via xB Browser by directing the applications' traffic to a SOCKS proxy at localhost, port 9050. This port can be changed via xB Config, an INI generator for xB Browser.

XeroBank network
xB Browser is optimized for use on the XeroBank anonymity network, which is a private and commercial broadband network operated by Xero Networks AG. The XeroBank network routes traffic through at least two multi-jurisdictional hops. In contrast to Tor, the XeroBank network supports both TCP and UDP protocols, performs channel multiplexing for low observability, is run by a single entity and costs money to use. The XeroBank network is accessible via SSH and OpenVPN protocols. xB Browser internally manages a SSH connection to XeroBank, but will recognize and submit to OpenVPN connections.

Features
Besides the anonymous networks, xB Browser uses following add-ons:
Adblock Plus,
Cookies and Flash cookies removal,
Browser history clearing after closing

References

2006 software
Anonymity networks
Cult of the Dead Cow software
Gopher clients
Portable software
Web browsers based on Firefox